Joo Won (born Moon Jun-won on September 30, 1987) is a South Korean actor best known for his roles in King of Baking, Kim Takgu (2010), Ojakgyo Family (2011), Bridal Mask (2012), Good Doctor (2013), Fatal Intuition (2015), Yong-pal (2015), My Sassy Girl (2017), and Alice (2020).

Early life and education
Moon Jun-won was born in Seoul, South Korea.

He studied at Kaywon High School of Arts and continued his education on Theatre and Arts in Sungkyunkwan University. In 2013, Joo Won announced that he would be furthering his studies at Konkuk University.

Career

2006–2009: Beginnings
Upon making it into college, Joo Won's father came up with the stage name Joo Won for him as the Hangul pronunciation of the name sounds similar to "God-willing".

With his love for singing, he became involved in Frees, a co-ed television performance group formed by SBS as part of a children's TV program. The show premiered in 2006, but Joo Won left the show quickly thereafter. Joo Won later auditioned for the stage musical Altar Boyz, based on the American musical of the same name. This musical role was a first of many to come, as he later appeared in other musicals, namely Singles, Grease, Sinsangnam and most notably, Spring Awakening.

Originally, Joo Won was the understudy for Melchior in Spring Awakening. However, the original actor who played Melchior left the musical midway through the production, thus allowing Joo Won to perform later on in the production. His performance in Spring Awakening caught the attention of his future agency, Sim Entertainment.

2010–2012: Rising popularity and breakthrough
Joo Won first appeared in the 2010 television drama King of Baking, Kim Takgu as the antagonist to the titular character. King of Baking, Kim Takgu recorded high viewership ratings of over 50%, earning "national drama" status, and Joo shot to fame.

He went on to star in the KBS2 weekend family drama Ojakgyo Family in 2011, opposite Uee. He took home the Best New Actor award at the KBS Drama Awards and Baeksang Arts Awards. The same year, Joo made his big-screen debut in the action crime film S.I.U. alongside Uhm Tae-woong.

However, it was Joo's third small screen project Bridal Mask that truly propelled him to mainstream popularity. He portrayed a pro-Japanese Korean police officer by day and a masked vigilante who fights for Korean independence by night. For his role in Bridal Mask, Joo Won took home the Excellence award and Popularity award at the 2012 KBS Drama Awards. The same year, he starred opposite Park Bo-young in the horror thriller Don't Click, and joined the second season of the popular variety program 2 Days & 1 Night.

2013–2017: Mainstream success
In 2013, Joo starred in MBC's drama 7th Grade Civil Servant, based on the action-romance movie My Girlfriend Is an Agent. The same year, Joo was offered his most challenging role; an autistic savant who becomes a genius pediatric surgeon for KBS's medical drama Good Doctor.

After four years of absence from the musical scene, Joo returned to the musical stage with the Korean version of Ghost the Musical. Due to schedule conflicts, he has since stepped down from 2 Days & 1 Night to concentrate on his acting career. In late 2013, Joo starred in the romantic comedy film Steal My Heart opposite Kim Ah-joong.

In 2014, Joo starred in Fashion King, based on a popular webtoon of the same title. He returned to the small screen with Naeil's Cantabile, the Korean adaptation of Nodame Cantabile.

In 2015, Joo starred in action thriller Yong-pal, alongside Kim Tae-hee. The drama garnered strong ratings and Joo won the Grand Prize (Daesang) at the SBS Drama Awards. He next starred in the thriller Fatal Intuition, which opened at the top of the box office, earning more than 1 million ticket sales.

On November 3, 2015, Joo received the "Most Welcomed Actor" award at the second Asian Influence Awards Oriental Ceremony held in China. He then starred in the Korean-Chinese film Sweet Sixteen, a romantic drama based on an Internet novel will depict the love story of three men and one woman.

Joo's final project before enlistment was My Sassy Girl, a historical remake of the 2001 hit film. The television series premiered in 2017.

2019–present: Comeback from military
In 2020, Joo returned to television in the SBS science fiction romance drama Alice. In 2022, he starred in the Netflix film Carter in the title role.

In November 2022, Joo Won signed with Ghost Studio.

Personal life

Military service
Joo Won started his mandatory military service on May 16, 2017. In June 2017, the actor completed his six-week basic training and became an assistant instructor for the 3rd Infantry Division.

During the military service, Joo Won emceed at the Armed Forces Festival 2017. He also participated at the 63rd Memorial Day Commemoration Ceremony on June 6, 2018 

On February 5, 2019, Joo Won was discharged from the military after completion of 21 months of mandatory military service.

Filmography

Film

Television series

Narration

Variety show

Music video appearances

Musical theatre

Discography

Soundtrack

Awards and nominations

State honors

Listicles

Notes

References

External links

Joo Won at Huayi Brothers 

1987 births
Living people
South Korean male musical theatre actors
South Korean male film actors
South Korean male television actors
Male actors from Seoul
Sungkyunkwan University alumni
21st-century South Korean male actors
Konkuk University alumni
Best New Actor Paeksang Arts Award (television) winners